The Hôtel du Plessis-Guénégaud was a French aristocratic townhouse (hôtel particulier), built 1630–1632 for the financier  to the designs of architect Clément Métezeau. It was located at what is now 13 Quai Malaquais in the 6th arrondissement of Paris. The hôtel was demolished in 1843.

History of its many names
His hôtel is shown as Hôtel de Brienne on the 1652 Gomboust map of Paris. Subsequently it was known by other names, including Hôtel de Conti (1660–1670), Hôtel du Plessis-Guénégaud (1670–1680, engraved by Jean Marot), Hôtel de Créquy (1680–1712), Hôtel de Lauzun (1712–1733), Hôtel de La Roche-sur-Yon (on the 1739 Turgot map of Paris), and Hôtel Mazarin (during the reign of Louis XVI). It became the property of the state during the French Revolution but in 1818 was returned to its former owners, who demolished it in 1843. The property was acquired by the École des Beaux-Arts in 1858, and Félix Duban began construction of the Bâtiment des Expositions, which was completed in 1862.

Hôtel de Conti
In 1660, Anne-Marie Martinozzi, Princesse de Conti, who was a niece of Cardinal Mazarin, acquired the hôtel, which then became known as the Hôtel de Conti. Two of her sons, Louis Armand de Bourbon (1661–1685) and François Louis de Bourbon (1664–1709), were born in it. In 1670 she exchanged this hôtel, as well as her beautiful country house in Bouchet, for the Hôtel de Guénégaud on the Quai de Nevers, only a short distance upstream. After the exchange, this house on the Quai Malaquais became the Hôtel du Plessis-Guénégaud, and her new house became the Hôtel de Conti. The Quai de Nevers was renamed Quai de Conti.

See also
 Hôtel de Conti

Notes

Bibliography
 Ayers, Andrew (2004). The Architecture of Paris. Stuttgart; London: Edition Axel Menges. .
 Berty, Adolphe; L.-M. Tisserand (1876). Topographie historique du vieux Paris: Région du Bourg Saint-Germain, [Vol. 3]. Paris: Imprimerie Nationale. Title page at Gallica.
 Deutsch, Kristina (2015). Jean Marot : Un graveur d'architecture à l'époque de Louis XIV. Berlin: De Gruyter. .
 Dumolin, Maurice (1929). Études de topographie parisienne, vol. 1. Paris. .
 Gady, Alexandre (2008). Les Hôtels particuliers de Paris du Moyen Âge à la Belle Époque. Paris: Parigramme. .
 Mauban, André (1944). Jean Marot: Architecte et Graveur Parisien. Paris: Les Éditions d'Art et d'Histoire. .

Plessis Guenegaud
Buildings and structures in the 6th arrondissement of Paris
Houses completed in 1632
Ancien Régime French architecture
Demolished buildings and structures in Paris
Former buildings and structures in Paris
1632 establishments in France
Buildings and structures demolished in 1843